Postcards from Home is the second solo album by English singer-songwriter Nick Heyward. It was released in October 1986 through Arista Records and produced two UK chart singles, ‘’Over the Weekend’’ (#43) and ‘’Goodbye Yesterday’’ (#82).

Recording and production
The album was produced by Heyward's manager, Graham Sacher, and recorded at four studios: Oasis, Marcus, Mayfair and PRT.

Track listing

Personnel 
Credits are adapted from the album's liner notes.

 Nick Heyward – vocals, electric guitar, acoustic guitar, design
 Peter Beckett – keyboards, backing vocals
 Chris Cameron – backing vocals
 Richard Cottle – keyboards, saxophone
 Blair Cunningham – drums
 Graham Edwards – bass guitar
 Steve Everett – drum programming, percussion
 Isaac Guillory – acoustic guitar, Spanish guitar
 Stevie Lange – backing vocals
 Keith More – guitar
 Charlie Morgan – drums
 Les Nemes – bass guitar
 Mike Parker – keyboards
 Neil Sidwell – trombone
 Steve Sidwell – trumpet
 Phil Smith – saxophone
 Paul Spong – trumpet
 Miriam Stockley – backing vocals
 Ali Thompson – backing vocals
 Paul Westwood – bass guitar

Production
 Graham Sacher – record producer
 Alan Leeming – engineer
 John Etchels – engineer
 John Galon – engineer
 Tim O’Sullivan – photography
 SPIRY – mastering
 Simon Halfon – design

References

External links 
 
 

1986 albums
Nick Heyward albums
Arista Records albums